Parmouti 17 - Coptic Calendar - Parmouti 19

The eighteenth day of the Coptic month of Parmouti, the eighth month of the Coptic year. In common years, this day corresponds to April 13, of the Julian Calendar, and April 26, of the Gregorian Calendar. This day falls in the Coptic Season of Shemu, the season of the Harvest.

Commemorations

Martyrs 

 The martyrdom of Saint Arsenius, the Disciple of Saint Sousnyous

Saints 

 The departure of Saint Apollo, the disciple of Saint Samuel the Confessor

References 

Days of the Coptic calendar